Jarosław Nowicki (born 2 May 1970) is a Polish rower. He competed in the men's quadruple sculls event at the 1996 Summer Olympics.

References

1970 births
Living people
Polish male rowers
Olympic rowers of Poland
Rowers at the 1996 Summer Olympics
Sportspeople from Bydgoszcz